Needleman is a surname. Notable people with the surname include:

Alan Needleman, engineering professor at Brown University
Gastón Needleman, chess prodigy
Jacob Needleman, philosopher
Katherine Needleman, oboist
Herbert Needleman, known for research studies on lead poisoning
Rafe Needleman, magazine/website editor
Saul Needleman, bioinformatician